The 2019 Colorado Springs Switchbacks FC season is the club's fifth year of existence, and their fifth season in the Western Conference of the United Soccer League Championship, the second tier of the United States Soccer Pyramid.

Players

Competitions

Exhibitions

USL Championship 

On December 19, 2018, the USL announced their 2019 season schedule.

Standings

Match results 
Kickoff times are in MDT (UTC-06) unless otherwise noted

U.S. Open Cup 

As a member of the USL Championship, the Switchbacks will enter the tournament in the Second Round, to be played May 14–15, 2019

References

2019
Colorado Springs Switchbacks
Colorado Springs
Colorado Springs